Begin is the first Japanese album by J-pop group BeForU member Riyu Kosaka, released June 11, 2004. Many of these tracks are covers of popular bemani songs.

The title track of Riyu's debut single, "True...", is not included on this album. It was included on BeForU's debut album instead. Another version of the B-side track of that single, "Dive to the Night", is included however.

Track listing
 Begin
 Victory!!
 Lifeless
 Remember You...
 Speedy (Album Version)
 Glacial
 Kiss Me
 White Season
 Dive to the Night (TЁЯRA Works remix)
 Candy
 Don't Stop the music!!
 Sweetie (Album Version)
 Song for You (Album Version)
 Shining (Unplugged version)

On 2006, Riyu Kosaka said that Track 1 is a cover of Freedom by BeForU.
Track 2 is a cover of Crash! by Mr. Brian and The Final Band (Dancing Stage Euromix 2)
Track 3 is a cover of Still in My Heart by Naoki (Dance Dance Revolution 5th Mix)
Track 4 is a cover of Remember You by NM feat. Julia (Dance Dance Revolution 5th Mix)
Track 6 is a cover of Hyper Eurobeat by Naoki feat. DDR All Stars (Dance Dance Revolution Extreme)
Track 7 is a cover of Hysteria 2001 by NM (Dance Dance Revolution 7th Mix)
Track 8 is a cover of Silent Hill by Thomas Howard (Dance Dance Revolution 3rd Mix)
Track 9 is a cover of Dive by BeForU (Dance Dance Revolution 5th Mix)
Track 10 is a remake of Candy (Dance Dance Revolution 6th Mix)
Track 11 is a cover of Can't Stop Falling in Love by Naoki (Dance Dance Revolution Solo and Beatmania IIDX 3rd)
Track 14 is a cover of ☆shining☆ by BeForU (pop'n music 9)

Album details
 Arranged by:
 Naoki Maeda (1~3, 5~7, 10, 11, 14)
 Katsumi Yoshihara (2, 12)
 Platinum Patnuz (4, 13)
 Tatsh (8)
 Jun (9) 
 Composed by: Naoki Maeda
 Catalog Number: LC-1280

2004 albums
Riyu Kosaka albums